El Nakiri Mosque was a Tunisian mosque in the Medina of Tunis.
It does not exist anymore.

History

The mosque was located in Etataouni Street. It was built during the Hafsid era and consisted of a hall and the tomb of its founder.

Etymology
The mosque was named after the Imam Mohamed Etataouni who died in 1878.

References

Mosques in Tunis